Hassall Green is a village in the civil parish of Betchton in the unitary authority of Cheshire East and the ceremonial county of  Cheshire, England. It is traversed by the Trent & Mersey Canal.

See also
St Philip's Church, Hassall Green

References

Villages in Cheshire